Nesocordulia villiersi is a species of dragonfly in family Corduliidae. It is endemic to Comoros.

References

Moths of the Comoros
Corduliidae
Endemic fauna of the Comoros
Insects described in 1984
Taxonomy articles created by Polbot